"You're Invited (But Your Friend Can't Come)" is the debut single by American musician Vince Neil and his first solo single.

Background
This song exists in two different versions, the first of which was included on the soundtrack to the Pauly Shore movie Encino Man - a music video was later released for this version featuring a cameo from Shore. The track was later re-recorded for the 1993 album Exposed with Billy Idol guitarist Steve Stevens.

Track listing
1. "You're Invited (But Your Friend Can't Come)" - 3:52

Charts

References

1992 singles
Heavy metal songs
Songs written by Vince Neil
Warner Records singles
1992 songs